Venäläinen is a Finnish surname meaning "a Russian". Notable people with the surname include:

Ilja Venäläinen (born 1980), Finnish football player
Kati Venäläinen (born 1975; née Sundqvist), Finnish cross-country skier
Sami Venäläinen (born 1981), Finnish ice hockey player
Unto Venäläinen (born 1944), Finnish chess master

Finnish-language surnames